Mariola Wojtowicz (born 4 January 1980) is a Polish volleyball player, playing in position libero.

Sporting achievements

Clubs 
Polish Championship:
  2003, 2004, 2010
  2007
Polish Cup:
  2004, 2006
Polish Supercup:
  2006

National team 
Universiade:
  2007
  2005

References

External links
 TauronLiga profile
 Women.Volleybox profile
 CEV profile

1980 births
Living people
Polish women's volleyball players